BCore Disc is an independent Spanish record label focused on the hardcore punk DIY culture. It has been active since 1990 and it has released most of Spanish hardcore bands in its earliest period, and through the years it has opened its style range to all indie rock tendencies, from the poppier Les Philippes to the post-rock of G.a.s. drummers passing through Tokyo Sex Destruction's garage, Madee's emo, Standstill's vanguardist post-hardcore, The Unfinished Sympathy's melodic rock and Delorean's electronics. The company was also responsible for organizing the annual Hardcore Festival in Sant Feliu de Guíxols.

History
BCore Disc began in Barcelona 1990, with the edition of the first record by the Barcelonian band Corn Flakes, called No Problem. The following editions resulted from recovering the investment for the first record and re-investing it on a second release, and so on. It was then that BCore Disc became a bit more than a simple hobby. It became a small label with a very specific line and style and with a small fan base. Oral communication was the only way to distribute information about the label. There were no promos nor advertisements.

BCore Disc was one of the few labels which was run from Barcelona, putting out shows, editing albums, and distributing its own material. It was inspired in the way other labels around the world had already been working, such as Dischord.

Today, the label has grown in size, creating a small, but strong, independent scene in Spain, and is gaining popularity in the rest of Europe, the U.S., and even countries like Japan and Australia. BCore was the first Spanish independent label to have its whole catalogue uploaded on to the internet to be bought through worldwide music download stores such as iTunes Music Store, Napster, MSN.com and other several download sites.

Show bookings
The label was formed while organizing concerts for its bands and other foreign bands. Some of the bands they booked shows for in Barcelona include:

References

External links
BCore Disc website

Spanish record labels
Hardcore record labels
Record labels established in 1990